Jakob Friedrich Eisenlohr (23 November 1805, in Lörrach – 27 February 1854, in Karlsruhe) was a German architect and university professor. His design for a cuckoo clock, now known as the Bahnhäusle (train station) style, was the first to be mass-produced and helped make the clocks popular outside of Germany.

Life and work 
His father, Jakob Friedrich Eisenlohr (1777–1854), was an evangelical pastor. From 1821 to 1824, he studied in Freiburg im Breisgau with the architect, . After that, he moved to Karlsruhe, where he studied at the building school operated by Friedrich Weinbrenner. From 1826 to 1828, he continued his studies in Italy. 

After serving an apprenticeship, he became a teacher at the Polytechnischen Oberschule in Karlsruhe where, in 1839, he became a building official, and was appointed a Professor of architecture and construction. One of his first assignments, as an assistant to Heinrich Hübsch, was managing the relocation of a church belonging to Tennenbach Abbey. He also dealt with tall structures belonging to the Baden Railway, as well as planning stations and designing over 300 station-keeper's houses. 

In addition to his railway structures, he worked on the reconstruction of Ortenberg Castle, and designed several public buildings; such as the drinking hall in Badenweiler and the Freiburg festival hall. Together with the sculptor, August Kiss, he designed the Prussian monument at the old cemetery in Karlsruhe. 

In 1853, he was named head of the building school at the Karlsruhe Institute of Technology. He was married to Wilhelmine von Biedenfeld (1801–1882), the daughter of General .

Selected works

References

Further reading 
 Gerlinde Brandenburger, Denkmäler, Brunnen und Freiplastiken in Karlsruhe 1715–1945. Badenia-Verlag, 1987, 
 Hans Joachim Clewing, "Friedrich Eisenlohr. Der Zeichner und Baumeister", in: Badische Heimat, Vol.36, 1956

External links 

 Friedrich Eisenlohr @ Südwestdeutsches Archiv für Architektur und Ingenieurbau

1805 births
1854 deaths
19th-century German architects
Clock designs
Railway stations
Academic staff of the Karlsruhe Institute of Technology
People from Lörrach